The 1895 Kentucky Derby was the 21st running of the Kentucky Derby. The race took place on May 6, 1895.

Full results

 Winning Breeder: Augustus Eastin & Samuel E. Larabie; (KY)

Payout
 The winner received a purse of $2,970.
 Second place received $300.
 Third place received $150.
 Fourth place received $100.

References

1895
Kentucky Derby
Derby
May 1895 sports events
1895 in American sports